José Ribamar de Oliveira, best known as Canhoteiro  (24 September 1932 - 16 August 1974) was a Brazilian footballer, who played most notably for São Paulo FC. Canhoteiro means essentially "left footed."

Canhoteiro was regarded as one of Brazil's greatest dribblers of his generation. and played during a time of exceptional talent in that country. He had epic games against Pelé of Santos FC, one in particular in 1958, played under heavy rain at Pacaembu Stadium in São Paulo - the game ended tied at two goals each, with Pelé and Canhoteiro scoring both goals for each of their clubs. Canhoteiro, died pennyless and an alcoholic, the fate of many a footballer in the early years of the game.

One of his nicknames was "the Garrincha of the left".

References

 Gazeta Esportiva - Ídolos do futebol (Portuguese). View via .

External links 
 Brazilian National Team Archive (Portuguese/English)

1932 births
1974 deaths
Brazilian footballers
Brazilian expatriate footballers
Paysandu Sport Club players
São Paulo FC players
Deportivo Toluca F.C. players
Liga MX players
Brazil international footballers
Sportspeople from Maranhão
Expatriate footballers in Mexico
Saad Esporte Clube players
Association football wingers